Valeriy Iordan (born 14 February 1992) is a Russian athlete. Iordan won the silver medal at 2012 European Championships in Helsinki in Javelin Throw with result 83.23m, which is athlete's personal best.

International competitions

Seasonal bests by year
2010 - 74.86
2011 - 80.15
2012 - 83.23
2013 - 83.56
2014 - 82.05
2015 - 83.00

References

1992 births
Living people
Russian male javelin throwers
World Athletics Championships athletes for Russia
European Athletics Championships medalists
Russian Athletics Championships winners